

Alberta Provincial Highway No. 7, commonly referred to as Highway 7, is an east–west highway in the Calgary Region of Alberta, Canada.

Highway 7 begins in the Town of Diamond Valley, which was created on January 1, 2023 with the merger of the towns of Black Diamond and Turner Valley. The highway continues east, passing along the southern boundary of the Town of Okotoks. East of Okotoks, the highway ends at Highway 2 north of the Hamlet of Aldersyde, and is succeeded by Highway 547.

Highway 7 originally continued south from Black Diamond to Longview, but the section was renumbered replaced by Highway 22 in the early 1970s.

Major intersections 

The following is a list of major intersections along Alberta Highway 7 from west to east.

References 

007
Okotoks